Tin drum and similar may refer to:
The Tin Drum, a 1959 novel by Günter Grass
The Tin Drum (film), the film adaptation of that novel
Tin Drum (album), a 1981 album by the new wave/art pop band Japan

See also
Tyndrum, a town in Scotland